1st Army Corps may refer to:

 I Army Corps (Greece)
 I Army Corps (Wehrmacht)
 I Corps (British India)
 I Corps (India)
 I Corps (Polish Armed Forces in the West)
 I Corps (Sri Lanka)
 I Corps (United Kingdom)
 I Corps (United States)
 1st Army Corps (France)
 1st Army Corps (Russian Empire)
 1st Army Corps (Soviet Union)
 1st Army Corps (Armed Forces of South Russia)
 1st Army Corps (Azerbaijan)
1st Army Corps (Armenia)
1st Army Corps of the Russian Armed Forces (formerly the Donetsk People's Republic People's Militia, of Russian separatist forces in Donbas)

See also 
 1st Army (disambiguation)
 I Corps (disambiguation)